Christa Zander Welger (June 1939 – May 30, 2019) was a German-born wheelchair athlete. She represented West Germany and later the United States in various international events.

Early life 
Christa Zander was raised in Berlin during World War II, and then in West Berlin after the city was partitioned. She was paralyzed by polio at a young age, and developed physical strength in sports, including swimming and field events.

Career 
As a young woman, Zander belonged to the Handicapped Sports League of Berlin, and worked in a factory. She represented West Germany at the 1958 and 1959 Stoke Mandeville Games. She won eight medals at the 1960 Summer Paralympic Games in Rome. As Christa Welger, she represented the United States as a swimmer and field athlete at the Stoke Mandeville Games in 1962, and at 1964 Summer Paralympics in Tokyo, where she won a gold medal and three silver medals. She also competed at the National Wheelchair Games in 1963. She was inducted into the Adaptive Sports USA Hall of Fame in 1986.

Personal life and legacy 
Zander married American accountant and wheelchair athlete Saul Welger in 1962, and moved to New York to live with him. They had two children, born in 1966 and 1970. She was widowed when Saul died in 2002; she died in 2019. After her death, the Christa & Saul Welger Foundation was established, to continue their work in supporting sports opportunities for physically disabled youth.

References 

1939 births
2019 deaths
Sportspeople from Berlin
Paralympic archers of Germany
Paralympic athletes of Germany
Paralympic swimmers of Germany
Paralympic table tennis players of Germany
Paralympic track and field athletes of the United States
Paralympic swimmers of the United States
West German female javelin throwers
West German female shot putters
American female javelin throwers
People with polio
Paralympic gold medalists for West Germany
Paralympic bronze medalists for West Germany
Paralympic gold medalists for the United States
Paralympic silver medalists for the United States
Paralympic bronze medalists for the United States
Archers at the 1960 Summer Paralympics
Athletes (track and field) at the 1960 Summer Paralympics
Athletes (track and field) at the 1964 Summer Paralympics
Swimmers at the 1960 Summer Paralympics
Swimmers at the 1964 Summer Paralympics
Table tennis players at the 1960 Summer Paralympics
Medalists at the 1960 Summer Paralympics
Medalists at the 1964 Summer Paralympics
20th-century German women